Bruno Herrero Arias (born 13 February 1985), known simply as Bruno, is a Spanish professional footballer who plays as a midfielder.

Club career
Bruno was born in Jerez de la Frontera, Province of Cádiz. A product of Sevilla FC's youth system, he could never break into the first team, only making three La Liga appearances over two seasons, the first on 30 April 2006 as he played the last minute of a 2–1 away win against Real Sociedad.

In January 2007, Bruno was waived and joined Real Murcia in the Segunda División, playing nine games as the club returned to the top flight. However, as opportunities were rare in the following campaign, he moved again in January of the next year, being loaned to UD Salamanca.

Bruno had a breakthrough year in 2008–09, scoring ten league goals for the Pimentoneros for a final mid-table position. In the following season he played roughly the same matches and minutes, but netted seven goals less and also suffered relegation, signing for Xerez CD also of the second tier in early July 2010.

In the following years Bruno rarely settled with a club, representing Buriram United FC, Girona FC and Delhi Dynamos FC. On 7 July 2015, he joined North East United FC from the Indian Super League.

Bruno returned to Spain in January 2016, signing for division three team CD Atlético Baleares.

Personal life
Herrero's older brother, Jorge, was also a footballer and a midfielder. He too represented Xerez and San Fernando.

Club statistics

Honours
Sevilla B
Segunda División B: 2006–07

Buriram United
Thai Premier League: 2013
Thai FA Cup: 2013
Kor Royal Cup: 2013

References

External links

1985 births
Living people
Spanish footballers
Footballers from Jerez de la Frontera
Association football midfielders
La Liga players
Segunda División players
Segunda División B players
Tercera División players
Sevilla Atlético players
Sevilla FC players
Real Murcia players
UD Salamanca players
Xerez CD footballers
Girona FC players
CD Atlético Baleares footballers
San Fernando CD players
Xerez Deportivo FC footballers
Bruno Herrero
Bruno Herrero
Indian Super League players
Odisha FC players
NorthEast United FC players
FC Pune City players
Spain youth international footballers
Spanish expatriate footballers
Expatriate footballers in Thailand
Expatriate footballers in India
Spanish expatriate sportspeople in Thailand
Spanish expatriate sportspeople in India